Sant Adrià de Besòs and Estació de Sant Adrià (Catalan for "Sant Adrià Station") are a Rodalies de Catalunya commuter rail station and a Trambesòs tram stop, respectively, together forming an interchange station complex in Sant Adrià de Besòs, to the north-east of Barcelona, in Catalonia, Spain. It is operated by Renfe Operadora and is served by Barcelona commuter rail service line  and Girona commuter rail service line .

History

However, since several local factories were connected to the railway line, its opening was a major boost for the town’s economy. In 1888, with the opening of a steam tram line that travelled from Barcelona to Badalona, communications in the area were improved when a stop serving this new tram line was built in town.

In mid-1933, due to popular demand, Compañía de los Ferrocarriles de Madrid a Zaragoza y Alicante (M.Z.A.; "Madrid to Zaragoza and Alicante Railways Company") started the economic process to build a small halt on the Barcelona–Mataró Railway in Sant Adrià de Besòs. The new halt eventually started services on 10 October of that year. At that time, it was mainly served by commuter trains and did not have any ticket office so that tickets had to be bought on-train.

On , the first section of the Trambesòs system, which travelled from Barcelona's Plaça de les Glòries Catalanes to this stop, was opened as part of route .

On , Girona commuter rail service line , which is actually an extension of Barcelona commuter rail service line  towards Portbou, was launched and started serving the Rodalies de Catalunya station.

Station layout
The Rodalies de Catalunya station consists of two tracks served by their respective side platforms, which are partially covered by metal shelters and communicated by an underpass equipped with stairs and elevators. A small station building is located on the left side of the tracks, looking north, which consists of a single storey where there is a hall hosting the ticket gates to the platforms, ticket vending machines and a ticket office. On the opposite side of the station building, there are also some ticket gates providing direct access to the street and the Trambesòs stop.

The Trambesòs stop lies parallel to the Rodalies de Catalunya station, at the same level, in order to make transfers between the two transport modes easier. Located at the southernmost side of the railway station, the tram stop has two tracks served by an island platform equipped with the usual TRAM metal shelter, which includes ticket vending machines and information screens. As it is a terminus stop, the platform is slightly longer, so that two tramcars can be parked on each track.

Accessibility
In recent years, lifting platforms for wheelchair people were installed at the accesses to the underpass of the Rodalies de Catalunya station. They, nevertheless, did not work very often and received several complaints from a local association of physically disabled people. Thus, in order to improve the station's accessibility, in mid-2010, a complete renovation of the station with a budget of €740,000 was announced by Adif, the owner of the station.

On the other hand, the Trambesòs stop, as well as the rest of TRAM’s stops, was already designed to be accessible.

References

External links

 Sant Adrià de Besòs listing at the Rodalies de Catalunya website
 Photo gallery of the Trambesòs stop at TRAMvia.org 
 Upcoming departures and location information about the Trambesòs stop at Google Maps
 Information and photos about the Rodalies station and the Trambesòs stop at trenscat.cat 
 Picture of the opening ceremony of the station in 1933 from the Sant Adrià de Besòs City Council website

Railway stations in Spain opened in 1933
Railway stations in Barcelonès
Rodalies de Catalunya stations
Trambesòs stops
Transport in Sant Adrià de Besòs